Kottakkunnu is a tourist destination in the state of Kerala located at Malappuram. Stationed right at the heart of the city of Malappuram, Kottakkunnu attracts many domestic as well as international tourists.

Overview 
Kottakkunnu, Known as Marine Drive of Malappuram is a hill garden. Kottakkunnu park contains an Open Air theater, Lalitha Kala Academy Art gallery, a water theme park, Adventure Park, Kids traffic park, Balloon Park, 16D Cinema. There is a Water fountain and Laser show every weekend and on festivals like Eid, Onam, New year eve, etc. At Kottakkunnu one can see traces of the first fort built by the Zamorins. This tourism destination turned historic hill attracts lakhs of people per annum.  This scenic table-top location is at the crest of the Cantonment Hill near the District Collectorate in the heart of Malappuram city and 51 km from Kozhikode, 12 km from Kottakkal, 25 km from Calicut International Airport, 17 km from Angadipuram railway station and 29 km from Tirur railway station. Visitors are allowed up to 9pm. 
KSRTC Bus station located adjacent at Up Hill is the nearest bus station.

 Timing: 8:00 am – 8:00 pm
 Entry fee: INR 10 per person
 Paking fee: INR 10 for motorcycle 30 for cars

Best time to visit Kottakkunnu Park

The ideal time to visit Kottakkunnu Park is during the period of September to May, when the weather is pleasant and the natural scenery is at its best. The park offers a serene and tranquil ambiance, and the mornings and evenings are particularly enchanting. The cool breeze, the chirping of birds and the stunning views of the surrounding areas make for an unforgettable experience. Not only the weather is pleasant during these months but also it is the time when the park is at its most picturesque, with lush greenery and a profusion of colorful flowers. Visitors can enjoy a variety of activities, such as trekking, bird watching, and picnicking in the tranquil surroundings. The park is also a great place for nature lovers, photographers, and those looking to escape the hustle and bustle of daily life.

Activities In Kottakkunnu

Kottakkunnu Park offers a wide range of activities and attractions for visitors of all ages and interests. Some of the things to do at Kottakkunnu Park include:

 Open-air Theatre: The park features an open-air theater that hosts a variety of cultural and traditional events, including music and dance performances, plays, and other shows.         
 Lalitha Kala Academy Art Gallery : The park is home to the Lalitha Kala Academy, which is an art gallery that displays the works of local artists and craftsmen.
 Water Theme Park: The park features a water theme park that offers a variety of water-based activities, including swimming pools, water slides, and waterfalls.
 Adventure Park: The park has an adventure park that offers a range of thrilling activities, such as rock climbing, zip-lining, and rope courses.
 Children's Park: The park has a dedicated children's park that features a variety of fun and interactive activities, such as swings, slides, and playgrounds.
 Balloon Park: The park has a balloon park that offers a unique experience of viewing the park from above.
 16D Cinema: The park features a state-of-the-art 16D cinema that offers an immersive movie-watching experience.
 Kottakkunnu Park: The park itself offers a range of activities such as hiking, bird watching, and picnicking. The park also features a large playground, a food court, and a garden.

Master Plan
Kottakkunnu, being one of the high-earning tourism destinations in the state in the form of tickets, the Tourism department has planned to make this a one-stop destination with a variety of entertainment. In 2015, the tourism minister inaugurated the Kottakkunnu Master plan of 100cr worth projects. Some of the components under the master plan have opened and many are underway.

References 

https://www.malappuramtourism.org/kottakkunnu.php

Buildings and structures in Malappuram district
Amusement parks in Kerala